C-C chemokine receptor type 4 is a protein that in humans is encoded by the CCR4 gene. CCR4 has also recently been designated CD194 (cluster of differentiation 194).

The protein encoded by this gene belongs to the G protein-coupled receptor family. It is a receptor for the following CC chemokines:

 CCL2 (MCP-1)
 CCL4 (MIP-1)
 CCL5 (RANTES)
 CCL17 (TARC)
 CCL22 (Macrophage-derived chemokine)

Chemokines are a group of small structurally related proteins that regulate cell trafficking of various types of leukocytes. The chemokines also play fundamental roles in the development, homeostasis, and function of the immune system, and they have effects on cells of the central nervous system as well as on endothelial cells involved in angiogenesis or angiostasis.

CCR4 is a cell-surface protein and should not be confused with the unrelated carbon catabolite repression-negative on TATA-less (CCR4-Not), a nuclear protein complex that regulates gene expression.

Clinical significance
CCR4 is often expressed on leukemic cells in cutaneous T-cell lymphoma (CTCL).

As a drug target
Mogamulizumab is a humanised monoclonal antibody targeted at CCR4 and is an investigational drug for CTCL.

References

External links
 
 
 

Chemokine receptors
Clusters of differentiation